Şıxlar may refer to:
Shikhlar, Armenia
Şıxlar, Agdam, Azerbaijan
Şıxlar, Baku, Azerbaijan
Şıxlar, Gobustan, Azerbaijan
Şıxlar, Goranboy, Azerbaijan
Şıxlar, Goychay, Azerbaijan
Şıxlar, Jabrayil, Azerbaijan
Şıxlar, Jalilabad, Azerbaijan
Şıxlar, Khachmaz, Azerbaijan
Şıxlar, Khizi, Azerbaijan
Şıxlar, Masally (disambiguation)
Şıxlar (38° 57' N 48° 34' E), Masally, Azerbaijan
Şıxlar (39° 01' N 48° 46' E), Masally, Azerbaijan
Şıxlar, Qakh, Azerbaijan
Şıxlar, Sabirabad, Azerbaijan
Şıxlar, Yardymli, Azerbaijan